Rec Room may refer to:

 Recreation room, a room used for play, parties, or other recreational activities
 Rec Room (video game), a 2016 video game
 The Rec Room, a chain of entertainment restaurants